Mark Isham is a studio album by American musician Mark Isham, released in 1990 by Gold Rush. It received the Grammy Award for Best New Age Album at the 33rd Grammy Awards in 1991.

Track listing 
All tracks composed by Mark Isham; except where indicated
"Honeymoon Nights" 	
"I Never Will Know" (Tanita Tikaram) 	
"Marionette" 	
"An Eye on the World" 
"Blue Moon" (Lorenz Hart, Richard Rodgers) 	
"Ashes and Diamonds" 	
"Toward the Infinite White" 	
"Songs of the Flying Fish" (Isham, David Torn) 	
"Turkish Delight"

Personnel

Alex Acuña – drums, percussion
Tom Bouman – cover design
Terry Bozzio – drums
Chick Corea – piano
Douglas Brothers – photography
Bernie Grundman – mastering
Simon Hurrell – engineering
Mark Isham – electronic sounds, keyboards, percussion, producing, synthesizer, trumpet
Stephen Krause – engineering, mixing, producing
Douglas Lunn – bass

Larry Mah – assistant engineering
Ed Mann – vibraphone
Peter Maunu – acoustic guitar
Melanie Nissen – art direction
John Novello – organ
John Patitucci – bass
Rusty Striff – mixing assistant
Tanita Tikaram – vocals
David Torn – composer, guitar
Peter Van Hooke – drums, producer

Charting history

References

External links

1990 albums
Mark Isham albums
Albums produced by Mark Isham
Albums produced by Peter Van Hooke
Grammy Award for Best New Age Album